Tain Burghs, was a constituency of the House of Commons of the Parliament of Great Britain from 1708 to 1801 and of the Parliament of the United Kingdom from 1801 to 1832, sometimes known as Northern Burghs. It was represented by one Member of Parliament (MP).

Creation
The British parliamentary constituency was created in 1708 following the Acts of Union, 1707 and replaced the former Parliament of Scotland burgh constituencies of  Tain, Dingwall,  Dornoch,  Kirkwall and  Wick which had all been separately represented with one commissioner each in the former Parliament of Scotland. In 1707-08, members of the 1702-1707 Parliament of Scotland were co-opted to serve in the first Parliament of Great Britain. See Scottish representatives to the 1st Parliament of Great Britain, for further details.

Boundaries
The constituency was a district of burghs representing the Royal burghs of Dingwall, Dornoch, Kirkwall, Tain and Wick.

In 1832 the constituency was replaced by Wick Burghs and Cromarty was added to the district.

History
The constituency elected one Member of Parliament (MP) by the first past the post system until the seat was abolished for the 1832 general election.

The first Member of Parliament (MP), for the five Burghs, was elected at Tain in 1708. Lord Strathnaver was the eldest son of a Scottish peer. He would not have been eligible to be elected to the Parliament of Scotland. It was disputed that Strathnaver was eligible to be elected to the Parliament of Great Britain, as the representative of a Scottish seat.

On 3 December 1708, the House of Commons decided the issue, as at that time the House judged the eligibility of its members itself rather than leaving the issue to be decided by a Judge.

After the House called in counsel, the election petitions and representations in writing were read out and the lawyers put forward arguments for their clients. After counsel had withdrawn a question was formulated and put to a vote.

The proposition the House voted on was "that the eldest sons of the Peers of Scotland were capable by the Laws of Scotland at the time of the Union, to elect or be elected as Commissioners for the Shire or Boroughs [sic, see Burghs] to the Parliament of Scotland; and therefore by the Treaty of Union are capable to elect, or be elected to represent any Shire or Borough [sic] in Scotland, to sit in the House of Commons of Great Britain".

The House rejected the motion and so declared that Lord Strathnaver was ineligible to be elected an MP for Tain Burghs.

The most prominent English political figure, to represent a Scottish constituency in the 18th century, was Charles James Fox. In the 1784 general election, Fox sought re-election for the Westminster constituency. Political opponents challenged Fox's election. As Westminster had the largest electorate of any English borough, the scrutiny of votes (to check that each voter had been legally qualified to participate in the election) was thought likely to take a long time. To avoid Fox being out of Parliament, until the Westminster election petition was decided, a Scottish friend arranged for him to become member for Tain Burghs.

It took until 1786 for Fox to be confirmed as a duly elected MP for Westminster. Fox then chose to represent his English constituency and the Scottish one became vacant.

Members of Parliament

Elections
The electoral system for this constituency gave each of the five burghs one vote, with an additional casting vote (to break ties) for the burgh where the election was held. The place of election rotated amongst the burghs in successive Parliaments. The vote of a burgh was exercised by a burgh commissioner, who was elected by the burgh councillors.

The primary source for the results was Stooks Smith with additional information from the History of Parliament series. For details of the books used, see the Reference section below.

The reference to some candidates as Non Partisan does not, necessarily, mean that they did not have a party allegiance. It means that the sources consulted did not specify a party allegiance.

Elections of the 1700s

 1708 (3 December): Strathnaver declared ineligible as the eldest son of a Peer of Scotland

Elections of the 1710s

Elections of the 1720s

Elections of the 1730s

Elections of the 1740s

 Election declared void

Elections of the 1750s

Elections of the 1760s

Elections of the 1770s
 1773 (February): Resignation of Mackay

Elections of the 1780s

 1786 (March): Fox chose to represent Westminster, where he had been declared duly elected in the 1784 general election, after an election petition and a prolonged scrutiny of votes

 1786 (7 April): Ross died

Elections of the 1790s

 November 1797: Dundas appointed a Commissioner for the Affairs of India

Elections of the 1800s

 July 1804: Villiers appointed Chief Prothonotary Common Pleas of the County Palatine of Lancaster
 1805: Villiers resigned

 Mackenzie resigned to stand for Sutherland

Elections of the 1810s

Elections of the 1820s

Elections of the 1830s

 Constituency expanded and re-named in the 1832 redistribution

See also

Notes

References
 British Parliamentary Election Results 1832-1885, compiled and edited by F.W.S. Craig (Macmillan Press 1977)
 History of Parliament: House of Commons 1754-1790, by Sir Lewis Namier and James Brooke (Sidgwick & Jackson 1964)
 The Parliaments of England by Henry Stooks Smith (first edition published in three volumes 1844-50), second edition edited (in one volume) by F.W.S. Craig (Political Reference Publications 1973)
 

Historic parliamentary constituencies in Scotland (Westminster)
Constituencies of the Parliament of the United Kingdom established in 1708
Constituencies of the Parliament of the United Kingdom disestablished in 1832
Politics of the county of Caithness
Politics of Orkney
Politics of the county of Ross
Politics of the county of Sutherland